The 2013–14 Las Vegas Legends season was the second season of the Las Vegas Legends professional indoor soccer club. The Las Vegas Legends, a Pacific Division team in the Professional Arena Soccer League, split their home games between the Orleans Arena in Paradise, Nevada, and the Las Vegas Sports Park in Las Vegas, Nevada. The team was led by owner/head coach Meir Cohen with assistant coaches Patrick Lawrence and Peter Sharkey.

Season summary
The Legends started strong with 6 consecutive wins before losing to the San Diego Sockers in one of only two regular season home games the Las Vegas team plays at Orleans Arena this season. They recovered from this stumble to win their next 3, including a road win over San Diego, to give them a 9–1 record and sole possession of first place in the Pacific Division. The team finished strong, dropping road games to Toros Mexico and the Dallas Sidekicks but sweeping their season series with the Turlock Express, Sacramento Surge, and Ontario Fury.

The Legends finished the regular season with a 13–3 record and 1st place in the PASL's Pacific Division. In the post-season, they defeated the San Diego Sockers 11–7 in the Pacific Division Final to advance to the PASL Final Four. The fell 4–5 to Hidalgo La Fiera in the Semi-final match. They defeated the Cleveland Freeze 7–6 in the consolation game to take third place overall in the league.

The Las Vegas Legends participated in the 2013–14 United States Open Cup for Arena Soccer, starting with a Round of 32 win over the Las Vegas Knights of the Premier Arena Soccer League. They will beat the San Diego Sockers 12–9 in the Round of 16 on January 11 to advance to a Quarter-finals match on February 16 against Bay Area Rosal. They defeated Bay Area 21–0 to move on to the Semi-finals. Hidalgo La Fiera defeated the Legends 5–4 in a game that doubled as the PASL Semi-final match.

History
The Legends were successful in the 2012–13 season, compiling a 13–3 record in the regular season and clinching the Southwestern Division title. The team advanced to the postseason but ultimately fell to the San Diego Sockers 6–5 in overtime in the PASL National Championship Semi-Finals.

The Legends participated in the 2012–13 United States Open Cup for Arena Soccer. They defeated Real Phoenix in the Wild Card round, the CSC Cavalry of the Premier Arena Soccer League in the Round of 16, and the Tacoma Stars in the Quarter-Finals before losing in the Semi-Finals to the San Diego Sockers.

Roster moves
Alencar "Junior" Ventura was one of several players acquired by the Legends on or just before the February 1 trading deadline.

Awards and honors
On November 5, 2013, the Professional Arena Soccer League named forward Enrique Tovar as the PASL Player of the Week. The league cited his league-leading scoring efforts, including hat tricks in the team's victories over both Bay Area Rosal and the Sacramento Surge.

On November 26, 2013, the PASL named forward Ivan Campos as the league's Player of the Week. The league cited his offensive production this season, including a game-winning goal against the Ontario Fury in overtime.

On February 26, 2014, the PASL announced its "All-League" honors. Forwards Alex Caceres and Enrique Tovar were named to the All-League First Team and forward Ivan Campos was named to the All-League Honorable Mention list.

Schedule

Pre-season

Regular season

† Game also counts for US Open Cup, as listed in chart below.

Post-season

† Game also counts for US Open Cup, as listed in chart below.

U.S. Open Cup for Arena Soccer

References

External links
Las Vegas Legends official website
Las Vegas Legends at Las Vegas Review-Journal

Las Vegas Legends
Las Vegas Legends
Las Vegas Legends 2013
Las Vegas Legends 2013
Las Vegas Legends 2013